Eliana Martins (born 26 May 1986) is a Brazilian long jumper.

She competed at the 2007 World Championships, but without reaching the final. At the 2010 World Indoor Championships she failed to record a valid jump.

She competed at the 2020 Summer Olympics.

Personal bests
Long Jump: 6.74 (wind: +1.0 m/s) –  San Diego, 05 Apr 2019
Long Jump: 6.80 (wind: +2.2 m/s) –  Bragança Paulista, 20 Jun 2021

All information from World Athletics profile.

International competitions

References

1986 births
Living people
Brazilian female long jumpers
Athletes (track and field) at the 2015 Pan American Games
Athletes (track and field) at the 2019 Pan American Games
Pan American Games athletes for Brazil
World Athletics Championships athletes for Brazil
Athletes (track and field) at the 2016 Summer Olympics
Olympic athletes of Brazil
South American Games silver medalists for Brazil
South American Games medalists in athletics
Athletes (track and field) at the 2018 South American Games
Competitors at the 2013 Summer Universiade
Troféu Brasil de Atletismo winners
Athletes (track and field) at the 2020 Summer Olympics
People from Joinville
Sportspeople from Santa Catarina (state)
20th-century Brazilian women
21st-century Brazilian women